Arthur George Philip Frost (May 16, 1888 – May 7, 1965) was a Canadian politician who was a Member of Provincial Parliament in Legislative Assembly of Ontario from 1951 to 1959. He represented the riding of Bracondale for the Ontario Progressive Conservative Party. Frost was born in Toronto and was a florist. He also served as an alderman on the Toronto City Council.

References

1888 births
1965 deaths
Progressive Conservative Party of Ontario politicians